Mihailo Stevanovic (born 4 January 2002) is a Swiss professional footballer who plays as a midfielder for Luzern U21.

Club career
On 17 January 2020, Stevanovic signed a professional contract with FC Basel until 2022. Stevanovic made his professional debut with FC Basel in a 0-0 Swiss Super League tie with FC Luzern on 3 August 2020.

International career
Born in Switzerland, Stevanovic is of Serbian descent and is a dual citizen. He is a youth international for Switzerland.

References

External links
 
 SFL Profile
 SFV U16 Profile
 SFV U17 Profile
 SFV U18 Profile

2002 births
People from Liestal
Sportspeople from Basel-Landschaft
Swiss people of Serbian descent
Living people
Swiss men's footballers
Switzerland youth international footballers
Association football midfielders
FC Basel players
FC Luzern players
Swiss Super League players
Swiss Promotion League players